Partula taeniata, common name the Moorean viviparous tree snail, is a species of terrestrial gastropod in the Partulidae family. It is endemic to French Polynesia.

This species was considered to be extinct in the wild, but intensive field surveys have recently detected surviving wild populations.

Conservation status 
The species is listed as Critically Endangered in the 2013 IUCN Red List of Threatened Species.

Previously it was incorrectly listed as extinct in the 2007 IUCN Red List of Threatened Species and as Extinct in the wild in the 2009 IUCN Red List, although two subspecies survive in captivity and one still exists in the wild. This error may be the result of changing taxonomy (the subspecies were previously considered to be separate species).

Subspecies 
Listing of subspecies in the 2011 IUCN Red List of Threatened Species (not up to date):
 Partula taeniata taeniata Mörch, 1850 - extinct
 Partula taeniata elongata Pease, 1866 - extinct in the wild (rediscovered in 2003)
 Partula taeniata nucleola “Pease” Schmeltz, 1874 - extinct in the wild
 Partula taeniata simulans Pease, 1866 - extinct in the wild

References

External links

Partula (gastropod)
Fauna of French Polynesia
Taxonomy articles created by Polbot
Taxa named by Otto Andreas Lowson Mörch
Gastropods described in 1850